Click! Network is an open access broadband cable system owned by Tacoma Power, a part of Tacoma Public Utilities in Tacoma, Washington. It provides cable television and Internet connectivity for residents and businesses in Tacoma, University Place, Fircrest, Lakewood and Fife.

Back in the late 1990s there was talk of deregulation of the power industry, much like the banking and airlines industries flourished shortly after their deregulations. Utility companies are traditionally a very conservative business with relatively little change or innovation since the beginning of the century.  Tacoma Power's management team had the foresight to look into the future and predict some of the results that would come from deregulation of power companies.  Deregulation would mean that power companies would no longer have their protected monopolies and they would be forced into more of a delivery business since they would still own the wires.  To strengthen Tacoma Power's position in this type of a business environment Steven Klein, then Superintendent, suggested that they invest in an innovation in their power delivery system, i.e. the "SmartMeter".

When Tacoma Power started drawing up plans to develop a 100 million dollar fiber-optic network to link its power substations, and saw potential value for its customers at little additional cost to the utility to expanding the network to offer cable television, high-speed Internet and high-speed data services to the community. After originally approaching TCI Cable to be the cable television service provider and being turned down, Tacoma Power decided to create their own cable company. These services compete with the existing Comcast service providers in the area. Commercial high-speed data services began in 1997, cable TV in 1998, and high-speed Internet services over cable modem in 1999. Click! is one of the largest municipal telecommunications systems in the United States.

References

Internet service providers of the United States
Tacoma Public Utilities
Public utilities of the United States
Cable television companies of the United States